This is a list of foreign players in Russian Bandy Super League, which commenced play in 1992–93. The following players must meet both of the following two criteria:
have played at least one Elitserien game. Players who were signed by Russian Bandy Super League clubs, but only played in lower league, cup and/or European games, or did not play in any competitive games at all, are not included.
are considered foreign, determined by the following:
A player is considered foreign if he is not eligible to play for Russia national bandy team.

Russian teams can have a maximum of three foreign players in their match squad.

List of players

Finland

Sami Laakkonen – Vodnik, Zorky, Dynamo Kazan – 2004–14
Petteri Lampinen – Raketa, Zorky, Rodina – 2007–14

Sweden

Andreas Bergwall – Dynamo Kazan – 2007–10, 2011–12
Marcus Bergwall – Raketa, Dynamo Moscow – 2003–04, 2007–08
Daniel Berlin – Dynamo Moscow – 2013–14
Anders Bruun – Volga – 2013–14
Michael Carlsson
Christoffer Edlund – Yenisey – 2014–15
Ulf Einarsson
Olov Englund
Jesper Ericsson
Daniel Eriksson
Stefan Erixon
Andreas Eskhult
Joakim Hedqvist
Per Hellmyrs
Tobias Holmberg – SKA-Neftyanik – 2012–13
Hans Johansson
David Karlsson
Magnus Karlsson – Dynamo Kazan – 2013–14
Daniel Liw
Daniel Mossberg – Dynamo Moscow – 2011–14
Magnus Muhrén – Zorky, Dynamo Moscow, Raketa – 2005–07
Patrik Nilsson
Johan Östblom
Anders Östling
Joel Othén – SKA-Neftyanik – 2013–16
Erik Pettersson – Yenisey – 2017–18
Linus Pettersson
Martin Röing
Kalle Spjuth
Robin Sundin
Anders Svensson – Dynamo Kazan, Volga – 2012–15

See also
List of Russian Bandy Super League players
List of foreign Elitserien players

Notes

References

Russian Bandy Super League
foreign